Rajukalva is a village situated at Repalle in Andhra Pradesh, India.

Villages in Guntur district